Mørke gravers kammer is the third studio album by Norwegian black metal band Khold. It was released on 20 April 2004, through Candlelight Records.

Background 

Mørke gravers kammer was the band's first release on the Candlelight record label, after leaving Moonfog Productions.

Track listing

Release 

A music video was released for the track "Død". It was directed by Marcel Lelienhof, and produced by Andreas Rønning. The video was included as enhanced content for the original CD release.

Critical reception 

AllMusic's review was generally favorable, writing, "This CD isn't groundbreaking by 2004 standards [...] Nonetheless, Mørke gravers kammer is an appealing example of the more musical and intricate side of Nordic death metal/black metal."

Re-issue 

Mørke gravers kammer was re-issued on 16 July 2012, by Peaceville Records, featuring a bonus, previously unreleased track from the band's 2000 demo.

Personnel 
 Khold

 Gard – vocals, guitar
 Rinn – guitar
 Grimd – bass guitar
 Sarke – drums

 Additional personnel

 Lars Klokkerhaug – engineering, mixing
 Adrian Wear – sleeve layout and artwork
 Espen Berg – mastering
 Marcel Lelienhof – sleeve photography

References 

2004 albums
Khold albums